The following is a list of notable deaths in September 1994.

Entries for each day are listed alphabetically by surname. A typical entry lists information in the following sequence:
 Name, age, country of citizenship at birth, subsequent country of citizenship (if applicable), reason for notability, cause of death (if known), and reference.

September 1994

1
Konrad Ameln, 95, German hymnologist and musicologist.
Artur Balsam, 88, Polish-American classical pianist and pedagogue.
Thomas Chastain, 73, American author of crime fiction, lung cancer.
Hollis B. Chenery, 76, American economist.
Bob Greenwood, 66, Mexican baseball player.
Wallis Mathias, 59, Pakistani cricket player.
Charles Saunders, 91, New Zealand rower.

2
Roy Castle, 62, English dancer, singer, actor, television presenter and musician, lung cancer.
Walter Chyzowych, 57, Ukrainian-American soccer player.
Édouard Delberghe, 58, French racing cyclist.
Eugene Lawler, 61, American computer scientist.
Giuseppe Martano, 83, Italian road bicycle racer.
Mildred H. McAfee, 94, American academic, naval officer, and religious leader.
Harold Lamont Otey, 43, American convicted murderer, execution by electrocution.
Józef Światło, 79, Polish intelligence officer and defector .

3
James Thomas Aubrey, Jr., 75, American television and film executive, heart attack.
Harold Brewster, 91, American field hockey player.
Nikos Hadjikyriakos-Ghikas, 88, Greek painter, sculptor, engraver, writer and academic.
Monja Jaona, 84, Malagasy politician and nationalist.
Major Lance, 55, American R&B singer, cardiovascular disease.
Bernice Robinson, 80, American Civil Rights activist and education proponent.
Billy Wright, 70, English football player, stomach cancer.

4
Mark Bonham Carter, Baron Bonham-Carter, 72, English publisher and politician.
Richard Martin, 76, American actor, leukemia.
Roger Thomas, 68, British politician and Member of Parliament.
Robert Weaver, 70, American illustrator.

5
Hank Aguirre, 63, American baseball player and businessman, prostate cancer.
Shimshon Amitsur, 73, Israeli mathematician.
Bob Matheson, 49, American gridiron football player, lymphoma.
John Newman, 47, Australian politician, murdered.
Rudolf Raftl, 83, Austrian football goalkeeper.
Cliff Speegle, 76, American football player, coach, and college athletics administrator.
Ike Williams, 71, American Lightweight world boxing champion.
Fred Wilt, 73, American runner, Olympian, and FBI agent.

6
Louie Beltran, 58, Philippine journalist and columnist, heart attack.
Egon Eis, 83, Austrian screenwriter.
Edward Russell Gaines, 67, New Zealand Catholic bishop.
Nicky Hopkins, 50, English pianist and organist.
Max Kaminsky, 85, American jazz trumpeter and bandleader.
Duccio Tessari, 67, Italian director, screenwriter and actor, cancer.
Paul Xuereb, 71, Maltese politician and President of Malta.

7
James Clavell, 72, Australian-American author (Shōgun) and screenwriter (The Great Escape, The Fly), cancer.
Eric Crozier, 79, British theatrical director and opera librettist.
Georges Damitio, 70, French high jumper.
Chester A. Dolan, Jr., 86, American politician.
Alfred Loomis, 81, American investment banker, sailor and Olympic champion.
Frederick Manfred, 82, American writer of Westerns, brain cancer.
Dennis Morgan, 85, American actor-singer.
Godfrey Quigley, 71, Irish actor (Barry Lyndon, All Dogs Go to Heaven, Get Carter), Alzheimer's disease.
Nisith Ranjan Ray, 84, Indian historian and social activist.
Abul Lais Siddiqui, 78, Pakistani author, researcher, and scholar of Urdu.
Terence Young, 79, Irish film director (Dr. No, From Russia with Love, Thunderball), heart attack.

8
Juan Alonso, 66, Spanish football player.
Clara Breed, 88, American librarian.
Margaret Guido, 82, English archaeologist and prehistorian.
Walter Heiligenberg, 56, German scientist and neuroethologist, plane crash.
Sister Parish, 84, American interior decorator and socialite.
János Szentágothai, 81, Hungarian neuroscientist, academian and politician.
Eijirō Tōno, 86, Japanese actor (Seven Samurai, Tokyo Story, Tora! Tora! Tora!), heart failure.

9
Robert Austerlitz, 70, Romanian-American linguist.
Käthe Braun, 80, German actress.
Donald Court, 82, British paediatrician.
Reg Downing, 89, Australian lawyer, trade unionist and politician.
Alfred R. Loeblich, 80, American micropaleontology.
Douglas Morrow, 80, American screenwriter and film producer, aneurysm.
Patrick O'Neal, 66, American actor (The Way We Were, The Stepford Wives, Under Siege), respiratory failure.

10
Frank Broome, 79, English football player and manager.
Amy Clampitt, 74, American poet and author.
Mariateresa Di Lascia, 40, Italian politician, writer, and human rights activist, cancer.
Yevgeniy Dolmatovsky, 79, Soviet/Russian poet and lyricist.
Charles Drake, 76, American actor.
Max Morlock, 69, German football player, cancer.

11
Shimon Avidan, 83, Israeli officer.
Dernell Every, 88, American fencer.
Marianne Hold, 61, German movie actress, heart attack.
Raffaele Sansone, 83, Italo-Uruguayan football player and coach, Uruguay.
Sara Sothern, 99, American stage actress, and mother of Elizabeth Taylor.
Jessica Tandy, 85, British actress (Driving Miss Daisy, Fried Green Tomatoes, Cocoon), Oscar winner (1990), ovarian cancer.

12
Avtandil Chkuaseli, 62, Soviet football player.
Theo Crosby, 69, South African architect, writer and sculptor.
Jean-Baptiste Duroselle, 76, French historian and professor.
Tom Ewell, 85, American actor, and producer.
Pat Screen, 51, American attorney, and politician.
Frank White, 67, English botanist.
Boris Borisovich Yegorov, 56, Soviet physician-cosmonaut, heart attack.

13
Hind al-Husseini, 78, Palestinian woman.
Erich Buschenhagen, 98, German general in the Nazi Germany Wehrmacht.
Juozas Girnius, 79, Lithuanian existentialist philosopher.
Richard Herrnstein, 64, American psychologist at Harvard University, lung cancer.
Arthur Siegel, 70,  American songwriter, heart failure.
John Stevens, 54, English drummer.
Woodie Wilson, 68, American stock car racing driver, cancer.

14
William Berntsen, 82, Danish sailor and Olympic medalist.
Heinz Gerischer, 75, German scientist.
Marika Krevata, 83, Greek actress.
David van de Kop, 56, Dutch painter, draftsman and sculptor.

15
Ernst Fuchs, 57, Swiss racing cyclist.
Haywood Henry, 81, American jazz baritone saxophonist.
Héléna Manson, 96, French film actress.
Moana Pozzi, 33, Italian pornographic actress, television personality and politician, liver cancer.
Mark Stevens, 77, American actor, cancer.

16
Johnny Berry, 68, English football player.
Jorge Luis Córdova, 87, Puerto Rican judge and politician.
Jaywant Dalvi, 69, Indian writer.
Felisa Rincón de Gautier, 97, Puerto Rican politician and women's rights activist, heart attack.
Albert Decourtray, 71, French catholic cardinal, cerebral hemorrhage.
Jack Dodson, 63, American actor (The Andy Griffith Show, Mayberry R.F.D., All's Fair).
Dolly Haas, 84, German-American actress and singer, ovarian cancer.
Bernie Leighton, 73, American jazz pianist.
Noel Park, 73, Australian soldier, grazier and politician.
C. K. Ra, 77, Indian painter and writer.
Marshall Sprague, 85, American journalist and author.

17
Iris Adrian, 82, American actress and dancer.
Arnold Badjou, 85, Belgian football goalkeeper.
John Delafose, 55, American French-speaking Creole Zydeco accordionist.
Gego, 82, Venezuelan visual artist.
Vladimir Gershuni, 64, Soviet dissident and poet.
Vitas Gerulaitis, 40, American tennis player, carbon monoxide poisoning.
Katsuhiko Nakagawa, 32, Japanese actor and musician, leukemia.
Edward James Patten, 89, American lawyer and politician.
Karl Popper, 92, Austrian-British philosopher, academic and social commentator.
Thorsten Sellin, 97, Swedish-American sociologist, penologist and criminologist.
Peter Zaremba, 86, American athlete and Olympian.

18
Clarence Long, 85, American politician.
Franco Moschino, 44, Italian fashion designer and HIV/AIDS activists, AIDS.
Ivan Snoj, 70, Croatian handball coach and referee, official, journalist and publicist.
Clarence Williams, 39, American gridiron football player, shot.

19
Alberto Closas, 72, Spanish film actor, lung cancer.
Joseph Iléo, 73, Congoleze politician, Prime Minister.
Frankie Kennedy, 38, Northern Ire flute and tin whistle player, Ewing's sarcoma.
Don Lash, 82, American long-distance runner and Olympian, spinal tumor.

20
Benny Baker, 87, American actor and comedian.
Michael Dekel, 74, Israeli politician.
Jimmy Hamilton, 77, American jazz clarinetist and saxophonist.
Abioseh Nicol, 70, Sierra Leone Creole academic, diplomat, physician, and writer.
Reto Rossetti, 85, Poet and an Esperantist professor.
Jule Styne, 88, English-American songwriter and composer.
Bjarne Øen, 95, Norwegian pilot and airforce general.
Petr Čepek, 54, Czech actor, lung cancer.

21
Jimmy Carter, 70, American world lightweight boxing champion
Arthur B. Krim, 84, American entertainment lawyer and movie studio chairman.
Louis Orvoën, 74, French politician.
Russell Rowe, 79, Canadian politician.

22
Teddy Buckner, 85, American jazz trumpeter, cancer.
Maria Carta, 60, Italian folk music singer-songwriter, cancer.
Igor Chislenko, 55, Soviet/Russian football player.
Dorothy Dehner, 93, American painter and sculptor.
Leonard Feather, 80, British-American jazz pianist, composer, and producer.
Albert Hassler, 90, French ice hockey player and speed skater.
Edoardo Molinar, 87, Italian cyclist.
Hedwig Potthast, 82, German secretary and mistress of Reichsführer-SS Heinrich Himmler.
Andrew Rothstein, 95, British journalist.
Bud Sagendorf, 79, American cartoonist, brain cancer.
Edward Shackleton, Baron Shackleton, 83, British geographer, Royal Air Force officer and politician.

23
Jerry Barber, 78, American golfer.
Robert Bloch, 77, American author (Psycho), cancer.
Walter Gibbons, 40, American record producer and DJ, AIDS-related complications.
Alfred Lemmnitz, 89, East German politician.
Antanas Mikėnas, 70, Lithuanian athlete and Olympian.
Severino Minelli, 85, Swiss football player.
Zbigniew Nienacki, 65, Polish writer.
Jürgen Ohlsen, 77, German actor.
Madeleine Renaud, 94, French actress.
Nagendra Prasad Rijal, 67, Prime Minister of Nepal.
Johannes van Damme, 59, Dutch engineer and businessman, executed .

24
Barry Bishop, 62, American mountaineer, scientist, photographer and scholar, traffic accident.
Kathleen Collins, 91, American film actress of the silent era.
Carlos de Cárdenas, 90, Cuban Olympic sailor.
Joe Madro, 81, American National Football League football coach.
Ruth Niehaus, 69, German actress.
Mark Prudkin, 96, Soviet/Russian actor of theater and cinema.
Guido Santórsola, 89, Brazilian-Uruguayan composer, violinist, and conductor.
Otto Friedrich Walter, 66, Swiss publisher, author and novelist.
Muhammed Wattad, 57, Israeli Arab journalist, writer and politician, traffic collision.

25
Mark Alexander Abrams, 88, British social scientist.
Sašo Mirjanič, 26, Slovenian rower and Olympic medalist, traffic collision.
Antonio Negrini, 91, Italian cyclist.
Paul Oglesby, 55, American gridiron football player.
Lise Ringheim, 68, Danish film actress.
Charles Gage Van Riper, 88, American speech therapist.
Albert Watson, 72, American politician.

26
Maurice Ashley, 87, British historian .
Miguel Ángel Lauri, 86, Argentine football player.
Louis Ferdinand, Prince of Prussia, 86, German member of the House of Hohenzollern.
D. A. Webb, 82, Irish botanist, traffic collision.

27
Nigel Bowen, 83, Australian lawyer, politician and judge.
Denys Haynes, 81, English classical scholar, archaeologist, and museum curator, heart failure.
Vernon Kirby, 83, South African tennis player.
Carlos Lleras Restrepo, 86, Colombian politician and lawyer, respiratory failure.
György Tóth, 79, Hungarian football player and coach.

28
Urmas Alender, 40, Estonian singer and musician.
Greg Latta, 41, American gridiron football player, heart attack.
Abeti Masikini, 39, Belgian Congo singer, uterine cancer.
José Francisco Ruiz Massieu, 48, Mexican political figure, homicide.
Harry Saltzman, 78, Canadian theatre and film producer, heart attack.
Robert L. F. Sikes, 88, American politician.
K. A. Thangavelu, 77, Indian actor and comedian.
Ze'ev Tzur, 83, Israeli politician.

29
Cheb Hasni, 26, Algerian raï singer, terrorist attack.
O. S. Nock, 89, British railway signal engineer and author.
Frederick Schiller, 93, Austrian-British film actor.
Jack Spinks, 64, American gridiron football player.

30
Wilhelm Ernst Barkhoff, 78, German solicitor, banker, social reformer and anthroposophist.
Lina Basquette, 87, American actress, lymphoma.
Michael Flannery, 91, Irish republican and founder of NORAID.
Edmund Giemsa, 81, Polish soccer player.
André Lwoff, 92, French microbiologist and Nobel laureate.
Pierre Sabbagh, 76, French television journalist, producer and director.
Alex Scott, 34, British thoroughbred racehorse trainer, shot.
Roberto Eduardo Viola, 69, Argentine military officer and President of Argentina.
Sydney Walker, 73, American actor and voice artist, cancer.

References 

1994-09
 09